Dharisanam is a 1970 Indian Tamil-language film produced and directed by V. T. Arasu. The film stars A. V. M. Rajan and Pushpalatha. It was released on 6 February 1970.

Plot

Cast 
 A. V. M. Rajan
 Pushpalatha
 Srikanth
 Cho
 Manorama
 G. Sakunthala
 Shylashri
 Kumari Padmini
 Jayabharathi
 Vijayachandrika
 P. K. Saraswathi

Production 
Dharisanam was produced and directed by V. T. Arasu under Sendhoor Films, written by Singaravelan, photographed by Bombay Maniyam and edited by K. Govindaswamy. It was based on the story The Scapegoat by Daphne Du Maurier.

Soundtrack 
The soundtrack was composed by Soolamangalam Rajalakshmi in her film debut, and the lyrics were written by Kannadasan.

Release and reception 
Dharisanam was released on 6 February 1970. The Indian Express wrote, "The familiar plot with two similar-looking persons and its repurcussions—in this movie, good—are over-stressed. The screenplay is very school-boyish and so are the other aspects of the film."

References

External links 
 

1970s Tamil-language films